532–534 East State Street is a historic building in Savannah, Georgia, United States. It is located in the northeastern tything of Greene Square and was built in 1897. It is part of the Savannah Historic District, and it stands immediately to the west of the John Dorsett House, the smallest free-standing house in the city.

See also
Buildings in Savannah Historic District

References

Houses in Savannah, Georgia
Houses completed in 1897
Greene Square (Savannah) buildings